Father Alberto Ángel Zanchetta was Secretary and General Chancellor of Ordinariato Castrense (Military Bishopric) of Argentina.

Fr. Alberto A. Zanchetta
Summary	Roman Catholic Priest.  
Diocese of the Military Services

Minister 24 November 1973, Archdiocese of Buenos Aires, Argentina
Consecrated priest by John C. Cardinal Aramburu
Login Military Status 01/04/1984	
He reached the degree of Commander (O-5) Argentine Navy
Navy Chaplain, Military Ordinariate, Argentina                         1984-2008

Chaplain, Navy Operations Command                                           2006
Chaplain, Argentine Navy Force, UN Peace Mission in Haití                   2005
Chancellor & Secretary, Military Ordinariate                           2003-2004
Chaplain, Training Ship ARA Libertad                           1988; 1992 & 1999
Navy Training Division - OCS & NCO Academy                             2000-2002
Chaplain, Navy Officer Academy                                         1993-1998
Navy Fleet                                               1984-1986 and 1989-1991
Navy Infantry Command (Marine).                                             1987

Archdiocese of Buenos Aires, Argentina                  1973-1983 & 2008 present

Professor Catholic University Argentina                                1978-1983
Professor Catholic University La Plata                                      2010
Parochial Vicar, Saint Peter                                                2009
Chaplain, Champagnat High School                                       1981-1983
Chaplain, John Fernández Hospital                                      1980-1983
Parochial Vicar, Saint Ramón                                           1978-1979
Parochial Vicar, Heart of Jesus                                             1977
Parochial Vicar, Our Lady of Lourdes                                   1975-1976
Parochial Vicar, Saint Cayetano                                             1974 
Education	
Metropolitan Seminary, Arch. Buenos Aires                              1965-1972
Catholic University Argentina
Faculty Philosophy and Letters                                              1968
Faculty of Canon Law                                                   1994-1998
Magister ethics to the social doctrine Light Church                    2010-2012

References 

Year of birth missing (living people)
Living people
Place of birth missing (living people)
Argentine military chaplains